Assaria is a city in Saline County, Kansas, United States.  As of the 2020 census, the population of the city was 428.

History
Assaria was laid out in 1879. The first post office in Assaria was established in September 1879.

A railroad previously ran north-south through Assaria, but it was later abandoned.

Geography
Assaria is located at  (38.680374, -97.604029).

Demographics

It is part of the Salina Micropolitan Statistical Area.

2010 census
As of the census of 2010, there were 413 people, 159 households, and 122 families living in the city. The racial makeup of the city was 98.3% White, 0.2% Native American, and 1.5% from two or more races. Hispanic or Latino of any race were 1.9% of the population.

There were 159 households, of which 34.6% had children under the age of 18 living with them, 65.4% were married couples living together, 6.3% had a female householder with no husband present, 5.0% had a male householder with no wife present, and 23.3% were non-families. 18.2% of all households were made up of individuals, and 7.6% had someone living alone who was 65 years of age or older. The average household size was 2.60 and the average family size was 2.95.

The median age in the city was 39.7 years. 27.4% of residents were under the age of 18; 6.3% were between the ages of 18 and 24; 22.6% were from 25 to 44; 30.4% were from 45 to 64; and 13.3% were 65 years of age or older. The gender makeup of the city was 50.8% male and 49.2% female.

2000 census
As of the census of 2000, there were 438 people, 153 households, and 123 families living in the city. The racial makeup of the city was 95.43% White, 1.14% Native American, 0.23% Asian, 2.05% from other races, and 1.14% from two or more races. Hispanic or Latino of any race were 3.65% of the population.

There were 153 households, out of which 43.8% had children under the age of 18 living with them, 72.5% were married couples living together, 7.2% had a female householder with no husband present, and 19.0% were non-families. 15.7% of all households were made up of individuals, and 4.6% had someone living alone who was 65 years of age or older. The average household size was 2.86 and the average family size was 3.23.

In the city, the population was spread out, with 32.4% under the age of 18, 7.1% from 18 to 24, 29.9% from 25 to 44, 20.3% from 45 to 64, and 10.3% who were 65 years of age or older. The median age was 35 years. For every 100 females, there were 95.5 males. For every 100 females age 18 and over, there were 85.0 males.

The median income for a household in the city was $44,792, and the median income for a family was $45,833. Males had a median income of $34,063 versus $24,375 for females. The per capita income for the city was $19,381. None of the families and 1.9% of the population were living below the poverty line, including no under eighteens and 2.2% of those over 64.

Education
The community is served by Southeast of Saline USD 306 public school district.  Southeast of Saline High School is located in Gypsum.

Assaria schools were closed through school unification. The Assaria Trojans won the Kansas State High School class B baseball championship in 1959 and 1960.

References

Further reading

External links

 Assaria - Directory of Public Officials
 Renaissance Cafe, in former 1919 Assaria High School
 Assaria city map, KDOT

Cities in Kansas
Cities in Saline County, Kansas
Salina, Kansas micropolitan area
1879 establishments in Kansas
Populated places established in 1879